The 2003 Lafayette Leopards football team represented Lafayette College in the 2003 NCAA Division I-AA football season. The team was led by Frank Tavani, in his fourth season as head coach. The Leopards finished sixth out of eight in the Patriot League. 

The Leopards played their home games at Fisher Field in Easton, Pennsylvania. All games were televised on Leopard Sports Network (LSN).

Schedule

References

Lafayette
Lafayette Leopards football seasons
Lafayette Leopards football